The 1929 Argentine Primera División was the 38th season of top-flight football in Argentina. The season began on July 21, 1929, and ended on February 9, 1930. This season saw the 35 teams of Primera, divided into two groups. The top 2 of each group qualified for the final stages of the tournament, which was eventually won by Gimnasia y Esgrima (LP).

The season was marred by mass abandonment of games, defending Argentine champion Huracán withdrew from 8 of its fixtures leaving them to finish in 14th place in the group. Several other teams withdrew from multiple games. Abandonments of games, discontinuations, and withdrawals were quite common in these early seasons (cf., for instance, the second half of the 1930 season ).

Colegiales returned to the first division after winning the Primera B championship last year.

Group A

Group B

2nd. Finalist Playoff 
As Boca Juniors and San Lorenzo finished equaled on points, they needed a playoff to decide which team went to the final and which to the 3rd/4th place playoff.

Match details

Third place

Match details

Championship final

Match details

Notes

References

Argentine Primera División seasons
p
p
1929 in Argentine football
1929 in South American football